Emertonia constricta is a species of copepod. It belongs to the family Paramesochridae. It lives in the North Sea.

References

Harpacticoida
Crustaceans described in 1935
Crustaceans of the Atlantic Ocean